The 2019 Antalya Open (also known as the Turkish Airlines Open Antalya for sponsorship reasons) was a men's tennis tournament played on grass courts. It was the 3rd edition of the event, and part of the ATP Tour 250 series of the 2019 ATP Tour. It took place at the Kaya Palazzo Resort in Belek, Antalya Province, Turkey, from June 23–29.

Singles main-draw entrants

Seeds

 Rankings are as of June 17, 2019.

Other entrants
The following players received wildcards into the singles main draw:
  Altuğ Çelikbilek 
  Cem İlkel 
  Ergi Kırkın

The following players received entry using a protected ranking into the singles main draw:
  Jozef Kovalík
  Janko Tipsarević

The following players received entry from the qualifying draw:
  JC Aragone
  Steve Darcis 
  Kevin Krawietz 
  Viktor Troicki

Withdrawals
Before the tournament
  Ričardas Berankis → replaced by  Bradley Klahn

Retirements
  Damir Džumhur

Doubles main-draw entrants

Seeds

 Rankings are as of June 17, 2019.

Other entrants
The following pairs received wildcards into the doubles main draw:
  Sarp Ağabigün /  Yankı Erel
  Tuna Altuna /  Cem İlkel

Champions

Singles 

  Lorenzo Sonego def.  Miomir Kecmanović, 6–7(5–7), 7–6(7–5), 6–1

Doubles 

  Jonathan Erlich /  Artem Sitak def.  Ivan Dodig /  Filip Polášek, 6–3, 6–4

References

External links 
Official website 

Antalya Open
Antalya Open
Antalya Open
Antalya Open